Masjid e Mahmood is a mosque in the city of Chennai, India, located in the Choolaimedu locality.

It is located in Basha street near Nungambakkam railway station.

Mosques in Chennai